Mayevka or Mayovka is the name of several rural localities in Russia.

Modern localities
Mayevka, Republic of Bashkortostan, a village in Churayevsky Selsoviet of Mishkinsky District in the Republic of Bashkortostan
Mayevka, Diveyevsky District, Nizhny Novgorod Oblast, a village in Diveyevsky Selsoviet of Diveyevsky District in Nizhny Novgorod Oblast
Mayevka, Vetluzhsky District, Nizhny Novgorod Oblast, a village in Kruttsovsky Selsoviet of Vetluzhsky District in Nizhny Novgorod Oblast
Mayevka, Orenburg Oblast, a settlement in Volodarsky Selsoviet of Pervomaysky District in Orenburg Oblast
Mayevka, Sverdlovsk Oblast, a settlement in Alapayevsky District of Sverdlovsk Oblast
Mayevka, Republic of Tatarstan, a village in Zelenodolsky District of the Republic of Tatarstan
Mayevka, Tula Oblast, a settlement in Shevelevskaya Rural Administration of Shchyokinsky District in Tula Oblast
Mayevka, Vladimir Oblast, a settlement in Alexandrovsky District of Vladimir Oblast

Alternative names
Mayevka, alternative name of Tsoros, a settlement in Yuzhnenskaya Rural Administration of Gorodovikovsky District in the Republic of Kalmykia; 
Mayevka, alternative name of Boskhachi, a settlement in Tsagan-Nurskaya Rural Administration of Oktyabrsky District in the Republic of Kalmykia;

Abolished localities
Mayovka, Kaliningrad Oblast, a former rural locality (a settlement) in Chernyakhovsky District of Kaliningrad Oblast; merged into the town of Chernyakhovsk in June 1996